The Heist (Spanish:El apando) is a 1976 Mexican crime film directed by Felipe Cazals and starring Salvador Sánchez, José Carlos Ruiz and Manuel Ojeda.

Cast
 Salvador Sánchez as Albino  
 José Carlos Ruiz as El Carajo  
 Manuel Ojeda as Polonio  
 Delia Casanova as La Chata  
 María Rojo as Meche  
 Álvaro Carcaño as Teniente 
 Luz Cortázar as madre del Carajo  
 Ana Ofelia Murguía as Celadora 
 Sergio Calderón as Oficial  
 César Sobrevals as Celador  
 Gerardo del Castillo as Policía  
 Adriana Rojo 
 Tomás Pérez Turrent as Preso de la fajina  
 Max Kerlow as Preso del suéter amarillo  
 Roberto Rivero 
 Pedro Montaño 
 María Barber
 Carlos Cardán
 Samuel Moreno as Policía  
 Guillermo Gil as Policia

References

Bibliography 
 Mora, Carl J. Mexican Cinema: Reflections of a Society, 1896-2004. McFarland & Co, 2005.

External links 
 

1976 films
1976 crime films
Mexican crime films
1970s Spanish-language films
Films directed by Felipe Cazals
1970s Mexican films